The Los Angeles Virtuosi Orchestra (also known as LAV) is an instrumental ensemble of professional musicians based in Los Angeles, California, committed to the support and advocacy of music education in schools and the community.  LAV supports music education through collaborative partnerships with the community, schools, agencies and other arts organizations and by donating 100 percent of net revenues from its subscription performances to advance music education.

History
Carlo Ponti founded the orchestra in December 2013.

The ensemble debuted at Napa Valley Festival del Sole in July 2014.

LAV's eight concert season (2022–23) is currently being performed in Los Angeles, California under 
Carlo Ponti, music and artistic director.

Composition
The Los Angeles Virtuosi Orchestra is an orchestra of professional musicians; its sizes ranges from 22 strings to a full orchestra of about 45 musicians, depending on the works performed.

References 

Musical groups from Los Angeles
Musical groups established in 2013
Non-profit organizations based in Los Angeles
2013 establishments in California
Arts organizations established in 2013
Orchestras based in California